Leskovec is a village in northern Croatia, part of the Štrigova municipality within Međimurje County. Village is located near the border with Slovenia.

History
Leskovec is first time mentioned in charter issued in year 1448 as Villa Leskocz.  In this charter Frederick II of Celje granted the village Leskovec to the chapel of Saint Jerome in nearby Štrigova.   In year 1664 chapel of Saint Jerome with Leskovec was granted to the Pauline Order from Šenkovec by count Petar Zrinski. In early 19th century Leskovec was granted to noble family Knežević.

Geography

Leskovec is located in valley between hills of Gornje Međimurje, southwest from municipality centre Štrigova. Leskovec had a population of 109 in 2011 census. Leskovec is experiencing population decline since the 1950s.

References

Footnotes

Citations

Populated places in Međimurje County